Joseph Chester "Boob" Fowler (November 11, 1900 – October 8, 1988), also nicknamed "Gink", was a Major League Baseball shortstop. He played for the Cincinnati Reds (1923–1925) and Boston Red Sox (1926).

Fowler saw most of his Major League action in 1924, playing in 59 games with a batting average of .333.  In 76 games for Cincinnati, he batted .335 (56-for-167).  He closed out his MLB career with two games for the Red Sox in 1926, going 1-for-8 and bringing his lifetime average down to .326.  Career totals include 1 home run, 18 runs batted in, 30 runs scored, and a slugging average of .406.  His fielding percentage of .905 was well below the Major League average during his era.

Fowler died at the age of 87 in Dallas, Texas.

External links
Baseball Reference
Retrosheet

Major League Baseball shortstops
Baseball players from Texas
Sportspeople from Waco, Texas
Cincinnati Reds players
Boston Red Sox players
1900 births
1988 deaths
Nashville Vols players